Henry Steven Sanhueza Galaz, (born 24 March 1996) is a Chilean footballer who currently plays for Unión La Calera as a defender.

Club career
Born in Constitución, Maule Region, he moved Colo-Colo youth set-up in 2008. During his years playing at the youth ranks, Sanhueza highlighted as centre back, being an undisputed player and even coming to dispute the 2013 Nereo Rocco Tournament at Gradisca d'Isonzo as team captain. On 24 September 2015, the sports magazine El Gráfico reported that his agent is Argentine businessman Fernando Felicevich, who has raised Chilean international figures such as Gary Medel and Alexis Sánchez.

In January 2016, Sanhueza was finally promoted to first-adult team, debuting in a friendly match against Peruvian side Universitario de Deportes in a 2–0 home win, with José Luis Sierra as coach.

International career
Along with Chile U20, he won the L'Alcúdia Tournament in 2015.

Honours
Chile U20
 L'Alcúdia International Tournament (1): 2015

References

External links
 

1996 births
Living people
People from Constitución, Chile
Chilean footballers
Chile under-20 international footballers
Colo-Colo B footballers
Colo-Colo footballers
C.D. Antofagasta footballers
A.C. Barnechea footballers
Rangers de Talca footballers
Club Deportivo Palestino footballers
Universidad de Concepción footballers
Unión La Calera footballers
Segunda División Profesional de Chile players
Chilean Primera División players
Primera B de Chile players
Association football defenders